Lombardy elected its eighth delegation to the Italian Senate on June 3, 1979. This election was a part of national Italian general election of 1979 even if, according to the Italian Constitution, every senatorial challenge in each Region is a single and independent race.

The election was won by the centrist Christian Democracy, as it happened at national level. Seven Lombard provinces gave a majority or at least a plurality to the winning party, while the agricultural Province of Pavia and Province of Mantua preferred the Italian Communist Party.

Background
For the first time the Italian Communist Party lost votes, after a period of terroristic attacks by the Red Brigades. Even the far-right Italian Social Movement was weakened. Between other minor parties, the Radical Party obtained its first seat.

Electoral system
The electoral system for the Senate was a strange hybrid which established a form of proportional representation into FPTP-like constituencies. A candidate needed a landslide victory of more than 65% of votes to obtain a direct mandate. All constituencies where this result was not reached entered into an at-large calculation based upon the D'Hondt method to distribute the seats between the parties, and candidates with the best percentages of suffrages inside their party list were elected.

Results

|-
|- bgcolor="#E9E9E9"
!rowspan="1" align="left" valign="top"|Party
!rowspan="1" align="center" valign="top"|votes
!rowspan="1" align="center" valign="top"|votes (%)
!rowspan="1" align="center" valign="top"|seats
!rowspan="1" align="center" valign="top"|swing
|-
!align="left" valign="top"|Christian Democracy
|valign="top"|2,117,789
|valign="top"|40.7
|valign="top"|21
|valign="top"|=
|-
!align="left" valign="top"|Italian Communist Party
|valign="top"|1,530,781
|valign="top"|29.4
|valign="top"|15
|valign="top"|1
|-
!align="left" valign="top"|Italian Socialist Party
|valign="top"|620,900
|valign="top"|11.9
|valign="top"|6
|valign="top"|=
|-
!align="left" valign="top"|Italian Democratic Socialist Party
|valign="top"|217,704
|valign="top"|4.2
|valign="top"|2
|valign="top"|1
|-
!align="left" valign="top"|Italian Social Movement
|valign="top"|186,412
|valign="top"|3.6
|valign="top"|1
|valign="top"|1
|-
!align="left" valign="top"|Italian Republican Party
|valign="top"|162,090
|valign="top"|3.1
|valign="top"|1
|valign="top"|=
|-
!align="left" valign="top"|Italian Liberal Party
|valign="top"|156,745
|valign="top"|3.0
|valign="top"|1
|valign="top"|=
|-
!align="left" valign="top"|Radical Party
|valign="top"|154,257
|valign="top"|3.0
|valign="top"|1
|valign="top"|1
|-
!align="left" valign="top"|Others
|valign="top"|63,291
|valign="top"|1.2
|valign="top"|-
|valign="top"|=
|- bgcolor="#E9E9E9"
!rowspan="1" align="left" valign="top"|Total parties
!rowspan="1" align="right" valign="top"|5,209,969
!rowspan="1" align="right" valign="top"|100.0
!rowspan="1" align="right" valign="top"|48
!rowspan="1" align="right" valign="top"|=
|}

Sources: Italian Ministry of the Interior

Constituencies

|-
|- bgcolor="#E9E9E9"
!align="left" valign="top"|N°
!align="center" valign="top"|Constituency
!align="center" valign="top"|Elected
!align="center" valign="top"|Party
!align="center" valign="top"|Votes %
!align="center" valign="top"|Others
|-
|align="left"|1
|align="left"|Bergamo
|align="left"|Angelo Castelli
|align="left"|Christian Democracy
|align="left"|54.8%
|align="left"|
|-
|align="left"|2
|align="left"|Clusone
|align="left"|Enzo Berlanda
|align="left"|Christian Democracy
|align="left"|62.1%
|align="left"|
|-
|align="left"|3
|align="left"|Treviglio
|align="left"|Vincenzo Bombardieri
|align="left"|Christian Democracy
|align="left"|55.7%
|align="left"|
|-
|align="left"|4
|align="left"|Brescia
|align="left"|Mino MartinazzoliGino Torri
|align="left"|Christian DemocracyItalian Communist Party
|align="left"|44.9%28.3%
|align="left"|
|-
|align="left"|5
|align="left"|Breno
|align="left"|Giacomo Mazzoli
|align="left"|Christian Democracy
|align="left"|54.2%
|align="left"|
|-
|align="left"|6
|align="left"|Chiari
|align="left"|Mario Pedini
|align="left"|Christian Democracy
|align="left"|56.6%
|align="left"|
|-
|align="left"|7
|align="left"|Salò
|align="left"|Fabiano De ZanEgidio Ariosto
|align="left"|Christian DemocracyItalian Democratic Socialist Party
|align="left"|48.0%6.5%
|align="left"|
|-
|align="left"|8
|align="left"|Como
|align="left"|Luciano ForniGianfranco Conti Persini
|align="left"|Christian DemocracyItalian Democratic Socialist Party
|align="left"|42.0%8.9%
|align="left"|
|-
|align="left"|9
|align="left"|Lecco
|align="left"|Tommaso Morlino
|align="left"|Christian Democracy
|align="left"|49.6%
|align="left"|
|-
|align="left"|10
|align="left"|Cantù
|align="left"|Luigi Granelli
|align="left"|Christian Democracy
|align="left"|47.5%
|align="left"|
|-
|align="left"|11
|align="left"|Cremona
|align="left"|Vincenzo VernaschiRenzo Antoniazzi
|align="left"|Christian DemocracyItalian Communist Party
|align="left"|39.6%36.6%
|align="left"|
|-
|align="left"|12
|align="left"|Crema
|align="left"|Ferdinando TruzziMaurizio Noci
|align="left"|Christian DemocracyItalian Socialist Party
|align="left"|48.4%13.2%
|align="left"|
|-
|align="left"|13
|align="left"|Mantua
|align="left"|Carlo GrazioliGiuseppe ChiaranteGino Scevarolli
|align="left"|Christian DemocracyItalian Communist PartyItalian Socialist Party
|align="left"|36.7%35.0%13.4%
|align="left"|
|-
|align="left"|14
|align="left"|Ostiglia
|align="left"|Agostino ZavattiniEnrico Novellini
|align="left"|Italian Communist PartyItalian Socialist Party
|align="left"|42.7%14.9%
|align="left"|
|-
|align="left"|15
|align="left"|Milan 1
|align="left"|Libero MazzaGiovanni Malagodi
|align="left"|Christian DemocracyItalian Liberal Party
|align="left"|37.2%9.7%
|align="left"|
|-
|align="left"|16
|align="left"|Milan 2
|align="left"|Giorgio PisanòGianfranco Spadaccia
|align="left"|Italian Social MovementRadical Party
|align="left"|7.3%6.0%
|align="left"|
|-
|align="left"|17
|align="left"|Milan 3
|align="left"|''None elected
|align="left"|
|align="left"|
|align="left"|
|-
|align="left"|18
|align="left"|Milan 4
|align="left"|Giovanni Spadolini
|align="left"|Italian Republican Party
|align="left"|7.9%
|align="left"|
|-
|align="left"|19
|align="left"|Milan 5
|align="left"|Mario Venanzi
|align="left"|Italian Communist Party
|align="left"|32.1%
|align="left"|
|-
|align="left"|20
|align="left"|Milan 6
|align="left"|Marina RossandaRino Formica
|align="left"|Italian Communist PartyItalian Socialist Party
|align="left"|33.7%13.8%
|align="left"|
|-
|align="left"|21
|align="left"|Abbiategrasso
|align="left"|Ada Valeria Ruhl
|align="left"|Italian Communist Party
|align="left"|35.7%
|align="left"|Ambrogio Colombo (DC) 36.3%
|-
|align="left"|22
|align="left"|Rho
|align="left"|Giorgio Milani
|align="left"|Italian Communist Party
|align="left"|37.7%
|align="left"|Vincenzo La Russa (DC) 34.6%
|-
|align="left"|23
|align="left"|Monza
|align="left"|Vittorino ColomboLibero Riccardelli
|align="left"|Christian DemocracyItalian Communist Party (Gsi)
|align="left"|39.9%30.9%
|align="left"|
|-
|align="left"|24
|align="left"|Vimercate
|align="left"|Giovanni MarcoraAngelo Romanò
|align="left"|Christian DemocracyItalian Communist Party (Gsi)
|align="left"|42.2%31.8%
|align="left"|
|-
|align="left"|25
|align="left"|Lodi
|align="left"|Camillo RipamontiRodolfo Bollini
|align="left"|Christian DemocracyItalian Communist Party
|align="left"|38.9%38.1%
|align="left"|
|-
|align="left"|26
|align="left"|Pavia
|align="left"|Armelino Milani
|align="left"|Italian Communist Party
|align="left"|37.7%
|align="left"|Angelo Cordara (DC) 34.1%
|-
|align="left"|27
|align="left"|Voghera
|align="left"|Carlo LavezzariGiovanni Bellinzona
|align="left"|Christian DemocracyItalian Communist Party
|align="left"|37.4%34.0%
|align="left"|
|-
|align="left"|28
|align="left"|Vigevano
|align="left"|Armando Cossutta
|align="left"|Italian Communist Party
|align="left"|43.2%
|align="left"|
|-
|align="left"|29
|align="left"|Sondrio
|align="left"|Eugenio TarabiniLibero Della Briotta
|align="left"|Christian DemocracyItalian Socialist Party
|align="left"|51.5%17.3%
|align="left"|
|-
|align="left"|30
|align="left"|Varese
|align="left"|Aristide MarchettiModesto MerzarioAttilio Spozio
|align="left"|Christian DemocracyItalian Communist PartyItalian Socialist Party
|align="left"|39.0%28.1%13.7%
|align="left"|
|-
|align="left"|31
|align="left"|Busto Arsizio 
|align="left"|Gian Pietro Rossi
|align="left"|Christian Democracy
|align="left"|42.4%
|align="left"|
|}

No senator obtained a direct mandate. Please remember that the electoral system was, in the other cases, a form of proportional representation and not a FPTP race: so candidates winning with a simple plurality could have (and usually had) a candidate (usually a Christian democrat) with more votes in their constituency.

Substitutions
Ambrogio Colombo for Abbiategrasso (36.3%) replaced Mario Pedini in 1980. Reason: resignation.
Vincenzo La Russa for Rho (34.6%) replaced Ferdinando Truzzi in 1981. Reason: resignation.
Angelo Cordara for Pavia (34.1%) replaced Giovanni Marcora in 1983. Reason: death.

Notes

Elections in Lombardy
1979 elections in Italy